Zhang Hong (born 19 January 1966) is a former Chinese handball player who participated at the 1988 Summer Olympics, where China finished 6th. Zhang also won a silver medal at the 1990 Asian Games.

References

Chinese female handball players
1966 births
Living people
Olympic handball players of China
Handball players at the 1988 Summer Olympics
Handball players from Shanghai
Asian Games medalists in handball
Asian Games silver medalists for China
Medalists at the 1990 Asian Games
Handball players at the 1990 Asian Games